Sergio Galdós and Gonçalo Oliveira were the defending champions but only Galdós chose to defend his title, partnering Renzo Olivo. Galdós lost in the semifinals to Orlando Luz and Camilo Ugo Carabelli.

Ignacio Carou and Facundo Mena won the title after defeating Luz and Ugo Carabelli 6–2, 6–2 in the final.

Seeds

Draw

References

External links
 Main draw

Lima Challenger - Doubles
2022 Doubles